The Coupe de France's results of the 1957–58 season. Stade de Reims won the final played on May 18, 1958, beating Nîmes Olympique.

Round of 16

Quarter-finals

Semi-finals

Final

References

French federation

1957–58 domestic association football cups
Coupe
1957-58